Exercise-induced laryngeal obstruction (EILO) is a transient, reversible narrowing of the larynx that occurs during high intensity exercise. This acts to impair airflow and cause shortness of breath, stridor and often discomfort in the throat and upper chest. EILO is a very common cause of breathing difficulties in young athletic individuals but is often misdiagnosed as asthma or exercise-induced bronchoconstriction.

Causes
EILO may arise because of a relative mechanical 'insufficiency' of the laryngeal structures that should act to maintain glottic patency.
It has been proposed that a narrowing at the laryngeal inlet during the state of high airflow (e.g. when running fast), can act to cause a pressure drop across the larynx which then acts to 'pull' the laryngeal structures together. The Bernoulli principle states that increasing airflow through a tube creates increasing negative pressures within that tube.
Complex neuromuscular functioning is required to maintain laryngeal opening and to allow the larynx to achieve a great number of tasks (i.e. speaking, airway protection, swallowing). It is thus also possible that EILO may arise as form a degree of neuromuscular failure.

A small heredity study indicated that an autosomal dominant model of inheritance with variable expressivity and reduced penetrance in males may be relevant; because in ten families studied, there was at least one affected person in every generation in which both parents were examined.

Further work is needed to determine if structural deficiencies in the laryngeal tissue of individuals with EILO are present.

Mechanism
EILO is typically caused by a narrowing of the supra-glottic structures of the larynx. In severe cases, these structures, also called arytenoids, can close over to almost completely close the laryngeal inlet.

In fewer cases, the glottic (i.e. vocal cord) structures close together and this is typically what happens during exercise-induced vocal-cord dysfunction.

EILO develops during intense exercise and closure develops as exercise becomes more intense.

Closure of the voice box during exercise causes increased 'loading' on the breathing system and the respiratory muscles have to work much harder.

Epidemiology
The prevalence of EILO in adolescents and young adults appears to be in the range of 5–7% in northern Europe.

Some, but not all studies report a higher female prevalence. Thus, in a study of 94 patients diagnosed using the CLE test, average age was ~15 years, and 68% were female.

In athletic individuals EILO appears to be a highly prevalent cause of cough and wheeze and can co-exist with EIB. In one study, of almost 90 athletes, with unexplained respiratory symptoms, EILO was found to be present in approximately 30% of athletes, whilst EILO and EIB co-existed in one in ten.

This condition can co-exist with other conditions, including severe asthma.

Clinical features 
 Key clinical features often include:
 Difficulty 'catching a breath'
 Wheeze or whistling sound; typically when breathing in when exercising hard 
 Throat or upper chest discomfort
 Symptoms often start to improve from the time of exercise cessation / reducing exercise intensity
 No improvement with standard asthma medication (e.g. salbutamol, albuterol).

Diagnosis

The current gold-standard means for diagnosing EILO is the continuous laryngoscopy during exercise test (CLE-test). This test involves the placement of a flexible laryngoscope via nostril, which is then secured in place and held with headgear. It allows continuous visualization of the laryngeal aperture during exercise. 
The CLE test can be used during indoor treadmill or cycle-ergometer exercise but also whilst rowing or swimming or exercising outdoors.

The examiner visually evaluates the relative change of the laryngeal inlet in the patient throughout the CLE-test. One common grading system uses 4 steps (0-3) on glottic and supraglottic level respectively. Grades 0-1 are considered normal, whereas grades 2-3 on either or both levels are consistent with EILO.
There is a need to identify other less-invasive means of making a secure diagnosis.

Treatment 

The current mainstay of treatment is therapy-based. Specialist breathing techniques, most commonly termed biphasic breathing techniques or EILOBI are recommended to reduce turbulent inspiratory airflow and thus reduce chance of laryngeal closure. 

Direct laryngeal visualisation during exercise to deliver biofeedback has been employed with success. 

The place of inspiratory muscle training (IMT) is yet to be defined in EILO therapy.

Surgical treatment with supraglottopasty has also been utilised with success.  

Avoiding unnecessary treatment with asthma inhalers is important.

References

Further reading
 
 
 
 

Exercise physiology
Respiratory physiology